This is a list of volcanoes in Brazil. Because Brazil does not have any active volcanoes, this list includes only extinct Brazilian volcanoes.

Additionally, a volcano was hypothesized to exist in the Nova Iguaçu area, in Rio de Janeiro, and was called the Nova Iguaçu Volcano. As of 2021, the scientific consensus is that it is not a volcano.

Volcanoes

References

Bibliography

Further reading 
 

Brazil
 
Volcanoes